Víctor Peralta (March 6, 1908 – December 25, 1995) was an Argentine boxer who competed in the 1928 Summer Olympics in Amsterdam, Netherlands. He was born in Buenos Aires.

In 1928 he won the silver medal in the featherweight class after losing the final against Bep van Klaveren.

1928 Olympic results

Below are the results of Victor Peralta from the 1928 Olympic boxing tournament in Amsterdam.  Peralta was a featherweight boxer who competed for Argentina.

 Round of 16: defeated Arthur Olsen II (Norway) on points
 Quarterfinal: defeated Georges Boireau (France) on points
 Semifinal: defeated Lucian Biquet (Belgium) on points
 Final: lost to Bep van Klaveren (Netherlands) on points (was awarded the silver medal)

References

External links
 profile
 sports-reference

1908 births
1995 deaths
Boxers at the 1928 Summer Olympics
Featherweight boxers
Olympic boxers of Argentina
Olympic silver medalists for Argentina
Boxers from Buenos Aires
Olympic medalists in boxing
Argentine male boxers
Medalists at the 1928 Summer Olympics